The 2015 West Virginia Mountaineers baseball team will represent West Virginia University during the 2015 NCAA Division I baseball season. The Mountaineers will play their home games at the newly constructed Monongalia County Ballpark as a member of the Big 12 Conference. They will be led by head coach Randy Mazey, in his 3rd season at West Virginia.

Previous season
In 2014, the Mountaineers finished the season 6th in the Big 12 with a record of 28–26, 9–14 in conference play. They qualified for the 2014 Big 12 Conference baseball tournament and were eliminated in the second round. They failed to qualify for the 2014 NCAA Division I baseball tournament.

New Venue
In June 2013, the West Virginia University Board of Governors approved a deal that would allow the baseball program to build a new stadium near the university's location of Morgantown. Ground broke on October 17, 2013, at the University Town Centre in nearby Granville. The first game at the venue is scheduled for March 17 against Waynesburg. After the college baseball season is over, the ballpark will be used by the West Virginia Black Bears, a Class A short-season affiliate of the Pittsburgh Pirates. The Black Bears relocated from Jamestown, New York, after the 2014 season.

Personnel

Roster

Coaching staff

Season

February
West Virginia opened their season with a three-game series against Clemson on the road at Doug Kingsmore Stadium. In game one of the series, freshman B. J. Myers (five innings) and junior Blake Smith (four innings) combined to shutout the Tigers, 2–0.

Schedule

! style="background:#00447C;color:white;"| Regular Season
|- valign="top" 

|- bgcolor="#bbffbb"
| February 13 || at #24 Clemson ||  || Doug Kingsmore Stadium • Clemson, SC || 2–0 || Smith (1–0) || Bostic (0–1) ||  || 4,890 || 1–0 || –
|- bgcolor="#ffbbbb"
| February 14 || at #24 Clemson ||  || Doug Kingsmore Stadium • Clemson, SC || 2–4 || Erwin (1–0) || Vance (0–1) || Moyer (1) ||  || 1–1 || –
|- bgcolor="#bbffbb"
| February 15 || at #24 Clemson ||  || Doug Kingsmore Stadium • Clemson, SC || 6–1 || Donato (1–0) || Koerner (0–1) ||  ||  || 2–1 || –
|- bgcolor="#ffbbbb"
| February 20 || at  ||  || J. I. Clements Stadium • Statesboro, GA || 4–7 || Pressey (1–0) || Keller (0–1) || Brown (2) ||  || 2–2 || –
|- bgcolor="#bbffbb"
| February 21 || at Georgia Southern ||  || J. I. Clements Stadium • Statesboro, GA || 12–4 || Vance (1–1) || Kelly (0–1) ||  ||  || 3–2 || –
|- bgcolor="#ffbbbb"
| February 22 || at Georgia Southern ||  || J. I. Clements Stadium • Statesboro, GA || 2–15 || Simmons (0–1) || Donato (1–1) ||  ||  || 3–3 || –
|- bgcolor="#ffbbbb"
| February 27 || vs.  ||  || Springs Brooks Stadium • Conway, SC || 2–5 || Jensen-Clagg (2–1) || Myers (0–1) ||  ||  || 3–4 || –
|- bgcolor="#ffbbbb"
| February 27 || at  ||  || Springs Brooks Stadium • Conway, SC || 3–4 (13 innings) || Beckwith (1–0) || Dotson (0–1) ||  ||  || 3–5 || –
|- bgcolor="#bbffbb"
| February 28 || vs.  ||  || TicketReturn.com Field • Myrtle Beach, SC || 7–6 || Hardy (1–0) || Henderson (0–1) || Wernke (1) ||  || 4–5 || –
|-

|- bgcolor="#ffbbbb"
| March 1 || vs. #25  ||  || TicketReturn.com Field • Myrtle Beach, SC || 1–2 || Mamlic (1–0) || Donato (1–2) || Roper (1) ||  || 4–6 || –
|- bgcolor="#bbffbb"
| March 6 || at  ||  || Thomas Stadium • Johnson City, TN || 7–6 || Smith (2–0) || Cate (0–1) ||  ||  || 5–6 || –
|- bgcolor="#bbffbb"
| March 7 || at East Tennessee State ||  || Thomas Stadium • Johnson City, TN || 18–2 || Vance (2–1) || Haeberle (2–2) ||  ||  || 6–6 || –
|- bgcolor="#bbffbb"
| March 8 || at East Tennessee State ||  || Thomas Stadium • Johnson City, TN || 13-4|| Donato (2–2) || Krieg (1–1) ||  ||  || 7–6 || –
|- bgcolor="#bbbbbb"
| March 10 || at  ||  || Liberty Baseball Stadium • Lynchburg, VA ||  ||  ||  ||  ||  || 7–6 || –
|- bgcolor="#ffbbbb"
| March 13 || at #16 Texas ||  || UFCU Disch–Falk Field • Austin, TX || 3–4 (10 innings) ||  ||  ||  ||  || 7–7 || 0-1
|- bgcolor="#bbffbb"
| March 14 || at #16 Texas ||  || UFCU Disch–Falk Field • Austin, TX || 7–6 (10 innings) ||  ||  ||  ||  || 8–7 || 1-1
|- bgcolor="#ffbbbb"
| March 15 || at #16 Texas ||  || UFCU Disch–Falk Field • Austin, TX || 1–5 ||  ||  ||  ||  || 8–8 || 1-2
|- bgcolor="#bbffbb"
| March 17 || Waynesburg ||  || CONSOL Energy Ballpark • Washington, PA || 14–9 ||  ||  ||  ||  || 9–8 || 1-2
|- bgcolor="#ffbbbb"
| March 20 || at Baylor ||  || Baylor Ballpark • Waco, TX || 4–5 ||  ||  ||  ||  || 9–9 || 1-3
|- bgcolor="#ffbbbb"
| March 21 || at Baylor ||  || Baylor Ballpark • Waco, TX || 4–10 ||  ||  ||  ||  || 9–10 || 1-4
|- bgcolor="#bbffbb"
| March 22 || at Baylor ||  || Baylor Ballpark • Waco, TX || 8–2 ||  ||  ||  ||  || 10–10 || 2-4
|- bgcolor="#bbffbb"
| March 24 || at  ||  || Jaycees Field • Nacogdoches, TX || 14–5 ||  ||  ||  ||  || 11–10 || 2-4
|- bgcolor="#bbffbb"
| March 25 || at  ||  || Clay Gould Ballpark • Arlington, TX || 6–4 ||  ||  ||  ||  || 12–10 || 2-4
|- bgcolor="#bbffbb"
| March 27 ||  ||  || CONSOL Energy Ballpark • Washington, PA || 9–2 ||  ||  ||  ||  || 13–10 || 2-4
|- bgcolor="#bbffbb"
| March 28 || Charleston Southern ||  || CONSOL Energy Ballpark • Washington, PA || 9–2 ||  ||  ||  ||  || 14–10 || 2-4
|- bgcolor="#bbffbb"
| March 29 || Charleston Southern ||  || CONSOL Energy Ballpark • Washington, PA || 8–0 ||  ||  ||  ||  || 15–10 || 2-4
|- bgcolor="#bbffbb"
| March 31 || at Pittsburgh ||  || Charles L. Cost Field • Pittsburgh, PA || 4–1 ||  ||  ||  ||  || 16–10 || 2-4
|-

|- bgcolor="#ffbbbb"
| April 2 || at Kansas State ||  || Tointon Family Stadium • Manhattan, KS || 2–8 ||  ||  ||  ||  || 16–11 || 2-5
|- bgcolor="#bbffbb"
| April 3 || at Kansas State ||  || Tointon Family Stadium • Manhattan, KS || 5–3 ||  ||  ||  ||  || 17–11 || 3-5
|- bgcolor="#bbffbb"
| April 4 || at Kansas State ||  || Tointon Family Stadium • Manhattan, KS || 3–2 ||  ||  ||  ||  || 18–11 || 4-5
|- bgcolor="#ffbbbb"
| April 7 || at #17  ||  || Shipley Field • College Park, MD || 7–12 ||  ||  ||  ||  || 18–12 || 4-5
|- bgcolor="#bbffbb"
| April 10 ||  ||  || Monongalia County Ballpark • Granville, WV || 6–5 (13 innings) ||  ||  ||  || 3,110 || 19–12 || 4-5
|- bgcolor="#bbffbb"
| April 11 || Butler ||  || Monongalia County Ballpark • Granville, WV || 8–0 ||  ||  ||  || 2,211 || 20–12 || 4-5
|- bgcolor="#bbffbb"
| April 12 || Butler ||  || Monongalia County Ballpark • Granville, WV || 12–4 ||  ||  ||  || 1,647 || 21–12 || 4-5
|- bgcolor="#ffbbbb"
| April 14 ||  ||  || Monongalia County Ballpark • Granville, WV || 3–5 ||  ||  ||  ||  || 21–13 || 4-5
|- bgcolor="#ffbbbb"
| April 17 || #23 Oklahoma ||  || Monongalia County Ballpark • Granville, WV || 0–2 ||  ||  ||  || 1,719 || 21–14 || 4-6
|- bgcolor="#bbffbb"
| April 18 || #23 Oklahoma ||  || Monongalia County Ballpark • Granville, WV || 6–5 ||  ||  ||  || 2,871 || 22–14 || 5-6
|- bgcolor="#ffbbbb"
| April 19 || #23 Oklahoma ||  || Monongalia County Ballpark • Granville, WV || 2–10 ||  ||  ||  ||  || 22–15 || 5-7
|- bgcolor="#bbffbb"
| April 21 ||  ||  || Monongalia County Ballpark • Granville, WV || 3–2 ||  ||  ||  ||  || 23–15 || 5-7
|- bgcolor="#ffbbbb"
| April 24 || Kansas ||  || Monongalia County Ballpark • Granville, WV || 1–3 ||  ||  ||  ||  || 23–16 || 5-8
|- bgcolor="#ffbbbb"
| April 25 || Kansas ||  || Monongalia County Ballpark • Granville, WV || 5–9 ||  ||  ||  ||  || 23–17 || 5-9
|- bgcolor="#bbffbb"
| April 26 || Kansas ||  || Monongalia County Ballpark • Granville, WV || 5–4 ||  ||  ||  || 1,503 || 24–17 || 6-9
|- bgcolor="#ffbbbb"
| April 28 || vs. Marshall ||  || Appalachian Power Park • Charleston, WV || 2–3 ||  ||  ||  || 2,263 || 24–18 || 6-9
|- bgcolor="#ffbbbb"
| April 29 || vs.  ||  || RU Baseball Stadium • Radford, VA || 4–9 ||  ||  ||  ||  || 24–19 || 6-9
|-

|- bgcolor="#ffbbbb"
| May 1 || #4 TCU ||  || Monongalia County Ballpark • Granville, WV || 4–9 ||  ||  ||  || 2,541 || 24–20 || 6-10
|- bgcolor="#ffbbbb"
| May 2 || #4 TCU ||  || Monongalia County Ballpark • Granville, WV || 2–6 ||  ||  ||  || 2,107 || 24–21 || 6-11
|- bgcolor="#ffbbbb"
| May 3 || #4 TCU ||  || Monongalia County Ballpark • Granville, WV || 0–5 ||  ||  ||  || 1,691 || 24–22 || 6-12
|- bgcolor="#ffbbbb"
| May 5 || at Virginia Tech ||  || English Field • Blacksburg, VA || 3–13 ||  ||  ||  ||  || 24–23 || 6-12
|- bgcolor="#bbffbb"
| May 8 || at #11 Oklahoma State ||  || Allie P. Reynolds Stadium • Stillwater, OK || 5–4 ||  ||  ||  ||  || 25–23 || 7-12
|- bgcolor="#bbbbbb"
| May 9 || at #11 Oklahoma State ||  || Allie P. Reynolds Stadium • Stillwater, OK ||  ||  ||  ||  ||  || 25–23 || 7-12
|- bgcolor="#bbbbbb"
| May 10 || at #11 Oklahoma State ||  || Allie P. Reynolds Stadium • Stillwater, OK ||  ||  ||  ||  ||  || 25–23 || 7-12
|- bgcolor="#ffbbbb"
| May 12 || Pittsburgh ||  || Monongalia County Ballpark • Granville, WV || 1–4 ||  ||  ||  || 3,037 || 25–24 || 7-12
|- bgcolor="#bbffbb"
| May 14 || Texas Tech ||  || Monongalia County Ballpark • Granville, WV || 6–4 ||  ||  ||  ||  || 26–24 || 8-12
|- bgcolor="#bbffbb"
| May 15 || Texas Tech ||  || Monongalia County Ballpark • Granville, WV || 8–2 ||  ||  ||  || 1,883 || 27–24 || 9-12
|- bgcolor="#ffbbbb"
| May 16 || Texas Tech ||  || Monongalia County Ballpark • Granville, WV || 2–8 ||  ||  ||  || 1,697 || 27–25 || 9-13
|-

|- 
! style="background:#00447C;color:white;"| Post-Season
|-

|- bgcolor="#ffbbbb"
| May 20 || #11 Oklahoma State || || ONEOK Field • Tulsa, OK || 0–3 ||  ||  ||  ||  || 27–26 || 9-13
|- bgcolor="#ffbbbb"
| May 21 || Oklahoma || || ONEOK Field • Tulsa, OK || 1–6 ||  ||  ||  ||  || 27–27 || 9-13
|-

|-
| style="font-size:88%"| All rankings from Collegiate Baseball.

References

West Virginia Mountaineers
West Virginia Mountaineers baseball seasons
West Virgin